David Parrott (c.1933 – 25 August 2018) was an English cricketer. He was a right-handed batsman who played for Oxfordshire.

Parrott, who played for Oxfordshire in the Minor Counties Championship between 1963 and 1973, made a single List A appearance for the side, during the 1972 season, against Durham. From the upper-middle order, he scored a single run.

Parrott died in Perth, Australia, on 25 August 2018, aged 85.

References

External links
David Parrott at Cricket Archive 

1930s births
2018 deaths
English cricketers
Oxfordshire cricketers
Place of birth missing
Year of birth uncertain